Inazuma Eleven GO is a 2011 to 2014 Japanese anime television series based on Level-5's video game series of the same name. The animated series was produced by OLM under the direction of Katsuhito Akiyama and consists of 141 episodes.

Episodes

Inazuma Eleven GO (2011–2012)

Inazuma Eleven GO: Chrono Stone (2012–2013)

Inazuma Eleven GO: Galaxy (2014–2015)

Media

Anime films

The first animated film, premiered in Japanese theaters on December 23, 2011.

In 2012, the crossover Inazuma Eleven GO vs. Danbōru Senki W film was revealed on the July issue of Shogakukan's Monthly Corocoro Comic magazine.

References

Inazuma Eleven (anime)
2011 anime television series debuts
Japanese children's animated sports television series
OLM, Inc.
TV Tokyo original programming
Anime television series based on video games
Association football in anime and manga